Alburnus atropatenae is a species of ray-finned fish in the genus Alburnus which is found in Iran..

References

atropatenae
Taxa named by Lev Berg
Fish described in 1925